Jack Parker (born March 11, 1945) is the former head coach of the Boston University Terriers men's ice hockey team.  The 2012–13 hockey season was Parker's 40th and final season as head coach of the Terriers, and his 47th overall at the school as a player or coach.

Playing career
Parker graduated from Catholic Memorial School in West Roxbury in 1964.  He played for the Terriers from 1965 to 1968.  The team was a combined 77–22–4 while Parker was a center for the team.  Parker played on three Beanpot Championship teams and two teams which played in the NCAA tournament placing fourth in 1966 and second in 1967.  Parker was captain of the team during his senior year on the team. Parker played against Boston College's former coach, Jerry York, while York was at BC and in high school.

Coaching career
Immediately after graduating, Parker was named head coach at Medford High School.  After only one year, he returned to BU as an assistant under his former college coach, Jack Kelley, and helped lead the Terriers to two consecutive national championships in 1971 and 1972.  After Kelley left the program to become general manager and head coach of the New England Whalers, Parker was promoted to B-team coach under his predecessor, Leon Abbott.

Abbott was abruptly fired on December 21, 1973 for withholding information about the eligibility of two Canadian players who had played junior hockey in their native country, even though a judge questioned the constitutionality of the rules allegedly violated.  Parker was named his successor.

Parker was named the NCAA Coach of the Year three times, the first after the 1974–75 season, again after the 1977–78 season and a third time after 2008-09. Parker was also named the Hockey East Coach of the Year after the 1985–86, 1991–92, 1999–2000, 2004–05 and 2005-06 seasons. On January 30, 2009, Parker claimed his 800th win in a 3-1 victory over Merrimack College.  He was only the third coach to win 800 games, and the first to do so with one team. On April 11, 2009, Parker won his 30th NCAA tournament game and third team national title.

Parker retired at the end of the 2012-13 season. He finished with a record of 897–472–115. At the time of his retirement, he was the third-winningest coach in NCAA history, behind only Ron Mason and Jerry York.  His 897 wins are far and away the most in BU history, and are more than four times the total of runner-up Harry Cleverly. He has had a hand in more than two-thirds of BU's all-time wins.  Apart from his one year as Medford High's coach, he spent the first 48 years of his adult life at BU as a player, assistant coach and head coach.

Retirement
On March 11, 2013, Parker announced that the 2012–13 season would be his last, telling BU Today, "Forty years is a long time to be at the same institution in the same job. I think I’m a little long in the tooth. I don’t think I’ve had the focus I need to have. I haven’t lost a step, but I don’t want to lose a step." In 2014, Coach Parker's jersey number 6 was retired by the Terriers in a ceremony during a game against the University of New Hampshire.

In 2017, he was inducted into the United States Hockey Hall of Fame.

Head coaching record

College

Notable players
A list of notable players whom Parker has coached:
Tony Amonte, Former NHL player
Bob Deraney, Providence Friars women's ice hockey coach (1999–present)
Jim Craig, 1980 Miracle on Ice Olympian
John Cullen, Former NHL player
Rick DiPietro, First goaltender selected with the number-one pick in an NHL entry draft. See 2000 NHL Entry Draft
Chris Drury, Hobey Baker Award winner in 1998
Mike Eruzione, Captain of the 1980 Miracle on Ice Olympic hockey team
Matt Gilroy, Hobey Baker Award winner in 2009
Shawn McEachern, Former NHL player
Rick Meagher, Former NHL player
Jack O'Callahan, 1980 Miracle on Ice Olympian. Former NHL player
Jay Pandolfo, Former NHL player
Tom Poti, Former NHL player
Travis Roy, Quadriplegic who injured himself eleven seconds into his first-ever shift, only player to have his number retired by Parker 
Dave Silk, 1980 Miracle on Ice Olympian
Mike Sullivan, Pittsburgh Penguins Head Coach (2015-present)
Keith Tkachuk, Former NHL player
Ryan Whitney, Former NHL player

See also
List of college men's ice hockey coaches with 400 wins

References

External links
 Boston University profile

1945 births
Living people
American men's ice hockey centers
Boston University Terriers athletic directors
Boston University Terriers men's ice hockey coaches
Boston University Terriers men's ice hockey players
High school ice hockey coaches in the United States
Lester Patrick Trophy recipients
Sportspeople from Somerville, Massachusetts
Ice hockey players from Massachusetts
Catholic Memorial School alumni
Ice hockey coaches from Massachusetts